George Noble Stearns (September 29, 1812 – July 19, 1882) was a tool designer and founded the George N. Stearns Company, a hardware business, in 1860 in Syracuse, New York.

After he became seriously ill in 1877, his son, Edward C. Stearns and daughter, Avis Stearns Van Wagenen took control of the firm and renamed it to E. C. Stearns & Company.

References

External links
 Memorial history of Syracuse, N.Y., from its settlement to the present time - Dwight Hall Bruce, Electronic Library, pg.649

1812 births
Businesspeople from Syracuse, New York
People from Berkshire County, Massachusetts
1882 deaths
19th-century American businesspeople